Audrey Sbongile Zuma (born 7 November 1961) is a South African politician, serving as a member of the National Assembly of South Africa since May 2019. She is a member of the African National Congress.

Background
Zuma completed grade 12 while attending school. She has been a member of the regional executive committees of the  ANC and its women's league.

Parliamentary career
For the 2014 general election, Zuma was placed 31st on the ANC's list of KwaZulu-Natal candidates for the National Assembly. She narrowly missed out on a place in parliament as the ANC won only 27 seats in KwaZulu-Natal.

She was moved up on the list for the 2019 general election, occupying the 8th position. She was elected to the National Assembly at the election.

After entering parliament, she became a member of the newly established Portfolio Committee on Employment and Labour. She currently serves as a member of said committee.

References

External links

Living people
1961 births
Zulu people
Members of the National Assembly of South Africa
Women members of the National Assembly of South Africa
African National Congress politicians
21st-century South African women politicians
21st-century South African politicians